A men's 3000 metres steeplechase event was held at the 1995 World Championships in Athletics in Gothenburg, Sweden. There were a total number of 36 participating athletes, with three qualifying heats, two semi-finals and the final held on Friday 11 August 1995.

Final

Semi-finals
Held on Wednesday 1995-08-09

Qualifying heats
Held on Monday 1995-08-07

References
 Results
 Results-World Athletics

 
Steeplechase at the World Athletics Championships